DEC Professional could refer to:

DEC Professional (computer), a line of PDP-11-based personal computers from Digital Equipment Corporation
The DEC Professional, a now-defunct magazine for administrators and managers of computer systems from Digital Equipment Corporation